The year 538 BC was a year of the pre-Julian Roman calendar. In the Roman Empire, it was known as year 216 Ab urbe condita. The denomination 538 BC for this year has been used since the early medieval period, when the Anno Domini calendar era became the prevalent method in Europe for naming years.

Events

By place

Near East 
 The Babylonian captivity of the Jews in Babylon ends when Cyrus the Great, king of Persia, allows them to return to Jerusalem under the leadership of Zerubbabel and Joshua the High Priest; possible start of construction of the Second Temple.

Births

Deaths

References 

530s BC